Singe is a surname. Notable people with the surname include:

 Arthur Singe (1898–1936), New Zealand rugby league player
Shane Singe (born 1980), New Zealand cricketer
William Singe (born 1992), Australian YouTuber, singer, songwriter, and producer

See also
Singer (surname)